is a Japanese master of Shotokan karate. He won the first of his two IAKF world championship Kumite titles in 1975, was part of the Japan team to win the team Kumite title in the third IAKF world championship and was twice JKA All-Japan kumite champion. He became the national coach of Denmark in 1975 and in 1978 returned to Japan where he currently manages the international affairs of the JKA.

Early life

Masahiko Tanaka was born in Tokyo on February 24, 1941. He studied agriculture and veterinary medicine at Nihon University. After graduating he chose karate as his way of life and continued studying at the Japan Karate Association (JKA) honbu dojo (headquarters training hall) in Tokyo under Masatoshi Nakayama, then the JKA's Chief Instructor.

Competition
Nakayama, former Chief instructor of the JKA wrote ‘There are very few competitors who can use both hands and feet with as much skill as Masahiko Tanaka’.

Major Tournament Success
3rd IAKF World Karate Championship (Bremen, 1980) - 1st Place Group Kumite
2nd IAKF World Karate Championship (Tokyo, 1977) - 1st Place Kumite
1st IAKF World Karate Championship (Los Angeles, 1975) - 1st Place Kumite
18th JKA All Japan Karate Championship (1975) - 1st Place Kumite
17th JKA All Japan Karate Championship (1974) - 1st Place Kumite
16th JKA All Japan Karate Championship (1973) - 3rd Place Kumite

Publications
Tanaka, is author of the famous ‘Perfecting Kumite’ textbook and also featured in M. Nakayama's ‘Best Karate’ series.

References

 

1941 births
Japanese male karateka
Karate coaches
Martial arts writers
Shotokan practitioners
Living people
Sportspeople from Tokyo
Nihon University alumni